Ihitte/Uboma is a Local Government Area of Imo State, Nigeria. Its headquarters are in the town of Isinweke.

 
It has an area of 104 km and a population of 120,744 at the 2006 census.

The postal code of the area is 472. One of the communities in Ihitte/Unoma is Ezimba.

References

Local Government Areas in Imo State
Local Government Areas in Igboland
Towns in Imo State